Fantasy Wargaming is a role-playing game published by Patrick Stephens Limited (U.K.) in 1981.

Description
Fantasy Wargaming is a fantasy system set in medieval Europe. The first half of the book introduces role-playing concepts and describes medieval Europe's history, economy, religion, magic, etc. The latter half contains the game rules, covering character creation (flavored by astrology), social class, combat (where PC behavior and morale is often controlled by the dice), large scale combat, magic (based on actual medieval concepts), clerics and divine power, and monsters.

Publication history
Fantasy Wargaming was edited by Bruce Galloway and published by Patrick Stephens Limited in 1981 as a 222-page hardcover. A second edition was published by Stein & Day in 1982. A third edition was published by Doubleday Book Club in 1982 as a 300-page digest-sized hardcover. It should not be confused with Fantasy Wargaming by Martin Hackett, which was published in 1990 by Patrick Stephens Limited.

Reception
W.G. Armintrout reviewed Fantasy Wargaming in The Space Gamer No. 56. Armintrout commented that "I've never seen a worse game. It's too bad that many people's first experience with FRP may be through buying Fantasy Wargaming through the Science Fiction Book Club."

In addition to that, Lawrence Schick has found the game rules of Fantasy Wargaming to be "rather complex" and the magic system "quite complicated".

Reviews
Different Worlds #18 (Jan., 1982)
Adventurer #2 (June/July, 1986)
Alarums & Excursions (Issue 326 - Oct 2002)
Commodore User

References

British role-playing games
Fantasy role-playing games
Role-playing games introduced in 1981